Lonicera × purpusii, the Purpus honeysuckle, is a hybrid species of flowering plant in the family Caprifoliaceae. It originated as a cross of garden origin between two Chinese species, L. fragrantissima and L. standishii.

The flowers are strongly fragrant with the typical honeysuckle scent. In a favourable environment it may be evergreen but is otherwise deciduous. In the latter case, the flowers are borne on the bare branches.

The widely grown cultivar 'Winter Beauty' is a recipient of the Royal Horticultural Society's Award of Garden Merit. It flowers best in full sun.

References 

purpusii
Hybrid plants